The Velika Kapela (lit. Great Chapel) is a large mountain range in the east of Gorski Kotar, Croatia.

The highest peak is Bjelolasica-Kula at 1533 m.a.s.l. It overlooks Velebit, Plješivica, islands Krk, Cres, Lošinj, and the Kvarner Gulf.

Velika Kapela belongs to the Dinaric Alps, and it stretches from the Gorski Kotar region in the west, to the Mala Kapela and Lika in the east, from the Ogulin-Plaški valley in the north, to the Vinodol coastline in the south. The area is narrowest mountain prague between continental Pannonia and the coastal Mediterranean. Velika Kapela is mainly composed of karst — limestone rocks.

On the Velika Kapela there are many protected areas and landscapes. The famous are White cliffs and Samarske cliffs, and Klek above Frankopan town of Ogulin.

See also 
 List of mountains in Croatia

References 

Mountain ranges of Croatia
Landforms of Lika-Senj County
Landforms of Primorje-Gorski Kotar County